Failosophy is an American comedy television series on MTV. The series ran from February 14 to April 25, 2013.

Premise
Hosted by comedian Hasan Minhaj, along with a panel of comedians and internet personalities, the series discusses humorous content found on the internet through social networking websites and other online fails. Each episode also has an audience-submitted recreation of an embarrassing incident they experienced themselves.

Episodes

Season 1 (2013)

References

See also
 @midnight, Comedy Central TV game quiz show featuring a panel of competing comedians

2010s American comedy game shows
2013 American television series debuts
2013 American television series endings
English-language television shows
MTV original programming